Pol Toledo Bagué (born 22 December 1994) is a Spanish tennis player.

Toledo Bagué has a career high ATP singles ranking of World No. 372 achieved on 6 August 2018. He also has a career high doubles ranking of World No. 204, which he achieved on 13 November 2017.

Toledo Bagué has reached 18 career singles finals with a record of 5 wins and 13 losses all coming on the ITF Futures tour. Additionally, he has reached 40 career doubles finals with a record of 24 wins and 16 losses, which includes 1 ATP Challenger doubles title at the 2017 San Benedetto Tennis Cup.

ATP Challenger and ITF Futures finals

Singles: 18 (5–13)

Doubles: 40 (24–16)

|}

External links
 
 

1994 births
Living people
Spanish male tennis players
Tennis players from Catalonia
Tennis players from Barcelona
Sportspeople from Girona